Battle of Shinanah was a major battle of the Saudi–Rashidi War, during the Unification of Saudi Arabia campaign, between Rashidi and Saudi rebels. It occurred on 29 September 1904, in town of Shinanah in Qassim region. After Ibn Saud victory in Battle of Bekeriyah, Ibn Saud planned to conquer the whole Qassim region. Ibn Rashid also planned to regain control on the region. The battle ended with Saudi victory, Ibn Saud gained thousands of the remains Turkish supplies in the town, Ibn Rashid and his Ottoman allies forced to move back to Rawdat Muhanna.

Notes

References
 Battle of Shinanah, Arabic Wikipedia

Ottoman Arabia
Shinanah 1904
1904 in Saudi Arabia